A Monster's Ball match is a professional wrestling, hardcore match staged by Impact Wrestling. Originally, the key premise of the match was that all contenders were sequestered alone in a locked room without light, food, or water for 24 hours before the match. This stipulation is intended to induce extreme feelings of aggression in the competitors. Once released, the wrestlers fight one another in a no disqualification match, with the usage of weapons encouraged. Victory can be achieved by pinfall or submission, with the match ending as soon as one wrestler is pinned or submits (there is no elimination format).
 
Due to the hardcore nature of the match, the Monster's Ball typically features numerous high spots. There have been 56 matches conducted by Impact Wrestling, with several unaffiliated independent promotions hosting the match as well. The match has almost always featured Abyss in some capacity. Having wrestled in 48 of 56 matches in Impact Wrestling and managing in one, it is his signature match. There are various weapons frequently used in the match, including thumb tacks, "Janice" (A board filled with nails, Abyss' signature weapon), and barbed wire.

Match history

Participant list
51 wrestlers took part in Monster's Ball matches and 13 knockouts competed in a monster's ball match. Abyss holds the record for most participation in a monster ball match having competed in 48 matches & managed in 1 and holds the record for most victories 19.

Abyss competed as Joseph Park in two Monster's Ball matches, while the rest as Abyss.
Jeff Hardy competed as Willow in one monster ball match, while the rest as Jeff Hardy.
Bully Ray competed as Brother Ray in one match, the other as Bully Ray.

Non-TNA Monster's Ball
A Monster's Ball match was announced by John Cena Sr. (father of John Cena), president of the Massachusetts-based Millennium Wrestling Federation on its MWF Xtra online show to take place at their Night of Champions show on June 21, 2008. Todd Hanson defeated Abyss, Rick Fuller and Brian Milonas to win the match and retain his MWF Heavyweight Championship. Through TNA's working relationship with Mexican promotion AAA, Verano de Escándalo on July 31, 2011, hosted a Monster's Ball match, where Chessman defeated Abyss, Extreme Tiger, and Joe Líder. On June 7, 2014, at House of Hardcore V, Abyss defeated Tommy Dreamer in a Monster's Ball match. On November 14, 2015, Abyss would face off against Sabu in a Monster's Ball match at House of Hardcore 11 in a losing effort. Abyss has brought the Monster's Ball match to several other independent promotions throughout the world. For example, in June 2018, Abyss was scheduled to face Jimmy Havoc in Melbourne, Australia in a Monster's Ball match at a World Series Wrestling event.

References

External links
Victory Road review
Bound For Glory review
TNA press release: Monster's Ball 2: Coming To "Bound For Glory"
TNA house show review
MWF XtraApril 2008 (during which John Cena Sr. announces Monster's Ball VII)

Professional wrestling match types
Impact Wrestling match types
2004 in professional wrestling